Hyperelliptic curve cryptography is similar to elliptic curve cryptography (ECC) insofar as the Jacobian of a hyperelliptic curve is an abelian group in which to do arithmetic, just as we use the group of points on an elliptic curve in ECC.

Definition
From this definition it follows that elliptic curves are hyperelliptic curves of genus 1. In hyperelliptic curve cryptography  is often a finite field. This agrees with the elliptic curve case, because it can be shown that the Jacobian of an elliptic curve is isomorphic with the group of points on the elliptic curve. The use of hyperelliptic curves in cryptography came about in 1989 from Neal Koblitz. Although introduced only 3 years after ECC, not many cryptosystems implement hyperelliptic curves because the implementation of the arithmetic isn't as efficient as with cryptosystems based on elliptic curves or factoring (RSA). The efficiency of implementing the arithmetic depends on the underlying finite field , in practice it turns out that finite fields of characteristic 2 are a good choice for hardware implementations while software is usually faster in odd characteristic.

The Jacobian on a hyperelliptic curve is an Abelian group and as such it can serve as group for the  discrete logarithm problem (DLP). The first type of group used was the multiplicative group of a finite field, later also Jacobians of (hyper)elliptic curves were used. If the hyperelliptic curve is chosen with care, then Pollard's rho method is the most efficient way to solve DLP. This makes it possible to use Jacobians of a fairly small order, thus making the system more efficient. But if the hyperelliptic curve is chosen poorly, the DLP will become quite easy to solve. In this case there are known attacks which are more efficient than generic discrete logarithm solvers or even subexponential. Hence these hyperelliptic curves must be avoided. Considering various attacks on DLP, it is possible to list the features of hyperelliptic curves that should be avoided.

Attacks against the DLP
All generic attacks on the discrete logarithm problem in finite abelian groups such as the Pohlig–Hellman algorithm and Pollard's rho method can be used to attack the DLP in the Jacobian of hyperelliptic curves. The Pohlig-Hellman attack reduces the difficulty of the DLP by looking at the order of the group we are working with. Requiring  usually suffices.

The index calculus algorithm is another algorithm that can be used to solve DLP under some circumstances. For Jacobians of (hyper)elliptic curves there exists an index calculus attack on DLP. If the genus of the curve becomes too high, the attack will be more efficient than Pollard's rho. Today it is known that even a genus of  cannot assure security. Hence we are left with elliptic curves and hyperelliptic curves of genus 2.

Another restriction on the hyperelliptic curves we can use comes from the Menezes-Okamoto-Vanstone-attack / Frey-Rück-attack. The first, often called MOV for short, was developed in 1993, the second came about in 1994. Consider a (hyper)elliptic curve  over a finite field  where  is the power of a prime number. For arbitrary curves  is very large (around the size of ); so even though the index calculus attack is quite fast for multiplicative groups of finite fields this attack is not a threat for most curves. The injective function used in this attack is a pairing and there are some applications in cryptography that make use of them.
There exists some independent usage in torus based cryptography.

We also have a problem, if , the largest prime divisor of the order of the Jacobian, is equal to the characteristic of  By a different injective map we could then consider the DLP in the additive group  instead of DLP on the Jacobian. However, DLP in this additive group is trivial to solve, as can easily be seen. So also these curves, called anomalous curves, are not to be used in DLP.

Order of the Jacobian
Hence, in order to choose a good curve and a good underlying finite field, it is important to know the order of the Jacobian. Consider a hyperelliptic curve  of genus  over the field  where  is the power of a prime number and define  as  but now over the field . It can be shown  that the order of the Jacobian of  lies in the interval , called the Hasse-Weil interval. But there is more, we can compute the order using the zeta-function on hyperelliptic curves. Furthermore  factors as  where  for all . Finally we have that the order of  equals .

References

External links
 Colm Ó hÉigeartaigh Implementation of some hyperelliptic curves algorithms using MIRACL

Public-key cryptography
Elliptic curve cryptography